Robson Toledo Machado (born 18 July 1981 in São Paulo), commonly known as Robson Toledo, is a Brazilian footballer who plays as a midfielder.

Football career
Toledo started his career at Campinas in São Paulo state. He was signed by Perugia, which was at that time in the Italian Serie A. He was then sent to Lugano of Swiss Nationalliga A to continue his youth career. He then transferred to Rieti of the Italian Serie D.

He then signed by Catanzaro, where he helped the club get promoted to Serie C1 in 2003 and subsequently to Serie B in 2004.

He was spotted by Udinese, where he was eventually signed in the January transfer window, but was soon loaned back to Catanzaro of rest of 2003–04 season.

In the following seasons, he was loaned to Napoli (Serie C1), Ascoli (Serie B), Cisco Roma (Serie C2) and Taranto (Serie C1).

On 5 July 2007, Ravenna, newly arrived in Serie B, signed Toledo in joint-ownership bid. In the summer of 2008, he was loaned to Pro Patria. On 27 June 2009, Ravenna announced that the club made a higher bid in a closed tender against Udinese to buy the remaining 50% rights to the player.

On 16 August 2010, he was loaned to Serie B team Triestina with an option to purchase. In January 2011, he was exchanged with Matías Miramontes.

In August 2011 he was signed by Como.

He then played two seasons for Pistoiese. In June 2014 he was signed by Arezzo, but was excluded by direct choice of head coach Ezio Capuano later in August.

References

External links
 
 Football.it Profile 
 
 Lega Calcio Profile 

1981 births
Living people
Footballers from São Paulo
Brazilian footballers
Association football midfielders
Brazilian expatriate footballers
Expatriate footballers in Italy
Serie B players
A.C. Perugia Calcio players
FC Lugano players
U.S. Catanzaro 1929 players
Udinese Calcio players
S.S.C. Napoli players
Ascoli Calcio 1898 F.C. players
Ravenna F.C. players
Aurora Pro Patria 1919 players
U.S. Triestina Calcio 1918 players
U.S. Cremonese players
Como 1907 players
U.S. Pistoiese 1921 players
S.S. Arezzo players